Aviya's Summer (translit. Ha-Kayits Shel Aviya) is a Hebrew-language book that became a bestseller. The 1985 autobiographical novel by theater actress Gila Almagor was made into a film released in 1988. The 96-minute film acts as a memoir of Almagor's childhood and provides insights into Israeli society in the early post-state period. The film was shot on location in Kfar Avraham, Petach Tikvah, Israel.

Plot
Aviya's Summer is set in the summer of 1951, in the newly established state of Israel. The film chronicles the life of ten-year-old Aviya, whose warm, loving, and fiercely independent mother, Henya (played by Almagor herself), is tortured by periodic mental breakdowns. Henya's psychological and emotional scars stem from her horrid experience during the Holocaust, and from the loss of her husband during the war. Henya was once considered to be a beautiful and courageous partisan fighter, yet now she is constantly mocked by native Israelis for her erratic behavior. She walks the thin line between sanity and madness, attempting to forge a life for herself and her daughter in the new realities of Israel.

Aviya is a bright girl with a vivid imagination, yet she is mocked by her peers. Her relationship with her mother is complex, at times affectionate, but also fragile. Aviya fantasizes that if she could only find her father, all her/her mother's problems would cease and her family would be whole again. Aviya's wild imagination regarding her quest to find her father leads to the climax of the film. The film ends with Aviya coming to terms with the realities of her life and reaching a maturity beyond her years.

Awards
The film has been the recipient of many Israeli prizes as well as various international awards, including a Silver Bear Award for outstanding artistic contribution at the 39th Berlin International Film Festival, Best Foreign Film – San Remo Festival, and Best Director/Best Actress – Silver Menorah Award. The film was selected as the Israeli entry for the Best Foreign Language Film at the 61st Academy Awards, but was not accepted as a nominee.

Cast
 Gila Almagor – Henya Aleksandrowicz
 Kaipo Cohen – Aviya Aleksandrowicz
 Marina Rosetti – Esther/Helena "Lena" Gantz
 Eli Cohen – Max Gantz
 Avital Dicker – Maya Abramson

Sequel

See also
 List of submissions to the 61st Academy Awards for Best Foreign Language Film
 List of Israeli submissions for the Academy Award for Best Foreign Language Film

References

External links
 

1988 drama films
1988 films
1989 films
Films based on autobiographical novels
Films based on Israeli novels
Films directed by Eli Cohen
1980s Hebrew-language films
Israeli crime drama films
Silver Bear for outstanding artistic contribution
Films set in 1951
Petah Tikva
1989 crime drama films
Fiction set in 1951